Progressive Students Collective (PSC) is a left-wing students’ organization based in Pakistan.

Formation 
Progressive Students Collective (PSC) was formed in 2016.

Activities 
PSC has organized many events highlighting rights of workers, students, youth, and general public like Faiz Aman Mela, 2018, Shehri Tahafuzz March, 2019 against Sahiwal killings, Labour Relief Campaign, protests against anti-people budget, extremism and violence at campuses, human rights violation, forceful abductions, and mob lynching theatre, Climate Justice March, Students Solidarity March in 2018, 2019, 2020 2021 and 2022.

PSC played important role in making student alliance in the form of student action committee in 2019. In 2019, PSC members including Arooj Aurangzaib faced huge criticism on raising slogans for Students Solidariy March. Members of PSC, also faced arrests in 2021 during the pandemic while protesting for online examination in Lahore. On February 9, 2022, PSC organised a series of protests in several cities to mark the 38th year of ban on student unions in Pakistan in 1984 by dictator Zia-ul-Haq. In Lahore, PSC also staged a sit-in outside Punjab Assembly. PSC also faced pressure from campus authorities against organizing study circles and participation in women rights' marches.

Citations/Sources

References

Students' federations of Pakistan
Student political organizations
Student politics in Pakistan